is a railway station in Kawara, Fukuoka Prefecture, Japan. It is on the Tagawa Line, operated by the Heisei Chikuhō Railway. Trains arrive roughly every 30 minutes.

On 1 April 2009, nearby Tagara High School acquired naming rights to the station.

Between 1899 and 1973, a short freight-only branch line ran from this station north to Natsuyoshi.

History
 1885 - The station opens as Kawara station of Hōshū Railroad
 1901 - Kyushu Railway merges with Hōshū Railroad
 1907 - Kyushu Railway is nationalized
 1943 - The station is renamed to Magarikane
 1987 - JNR is privatizated, and the station becomes part of JR Kyushu and JR Freight
 1989 - The station becomes part of Heisei Chikuho Railway

In the vicinity
Fukuoka Prefectural Tagawa High School
Fukuoka Prefectural Agricultural and Forestry High School
Magarikane Post Office
Muryōkō-ji Temple

Platforms

External links
Magarikane Station (Heisei Chikuhō Railway website)

References

Railway stations in Fukuoka Prefecture
Railway stations in Japan opened in 1895
Heisei Chikuhō Railway Tagawa Line